The false western froglet (Crinia pseudinsignifera) is a species of frog in the family Myobatrachidae.
It is endemic to Australia.
Its natural habitats are temperate forests, rivers, intermittent rivers, shrub-dominated wetlands, swamps, freshwater lakes, intermittent freshwater lakes, freshwater marshes, intermittent freshwater marshes, freshwater springs, rocky areas, arable land, pastureland, plantations, water storage areas, ponds, open excavations, wastewater treatment areas, seasonally flooded agricultural land, and canals and ditches.
It is threatened by habitat loss.

References

Crinia
Amphibians of Western Australia
Taxonomy articles created by Polbot
Amphibians described in 1957
Frogs of Australia